August Vesa (15 October 1878, Rantasalmi – 1 May 1918) was a Finnish journalist and politician. He was a Member of the Parliament of Finland from 1908 to 1909, representing the Social Democratic Party of Finland (SDP). During the Finnish Civil War, Vesa sided with the Reds, was arrested by White troops and shot.

References

1878 births
1918 deaths
People from Rantasalmi
People from Mikkeli Province (Grand Duchy of Finland)
Social Democratic Party of Finland politicians
Members of the Parliament of Finland (1908–09)
Finnish journalists
People of the Finnish Civil War (Red side)
People executed by Finland by firing squad
20th-century executions by Finland